Morris Williams (birth unknown – death unknown), sometimes spelled "Maurice", was an American Negro league pitcher in the 1920s.

A native of Texas, Williams played in the Negro minor leagues with the San Antonio Black Aces before making his Negro major leagues debut in 1920 with the Indianapolis ABCs. He played for Indianapolis again the following season, and may have played briefly for the Washington Potomacs in 1923.

References

External links
 and Seamheads

Year of birth missing
Year of death missing
Place of birth missing
Place of death missing
Indianapolis ABCs players
Baseball pitchers